Kasete Naufahu Skeen (born 10 September 1982) is the first Tongan alpine skier to compete at the FIS Alpine World Ski Championships. 

Skeen was born in London to an English mother and Tongan father. He grew up in Notting Hill attending Holland Park School.

Skeen competed in the Giant Slalom qualification race at the FIS Alpine World Ski Championships 2017 held at St Moritz, Switzerland. Whilst training in Val di Fiemme, Italy, Skeen was given the nickname "Il Tomba di Tonga" (The Tomba of Tonga) referring to the Italian alpine ski racer Alberto Tomba

Skeen is also a musician composing and performing on Nero's 2011 album Welcome Reality

References 

Tongan male alpine skiers

1982 births
Living people